Shadan Lund railway station is  located in Shadan Lund, Dera Ghazi Khan District in Punjab, Pakistan.

On November 9, 2001, the station was the site of a protest against airstrikes in Afghanistan by the United States military, with approximately 1,000 Muslim protesters. Police opened fire, killing four, when some protesters attempted to block a train.

See also
 List of railway stations in Pakistan
 Pakistan Railways

References

External links

Railway stations in Dera Ghazi Khan District
Railway stations on Kotri–Attock Railway Line (ML 2)